The Śvētāmbara (śvētapaṭa; also spelled Shwethambara, Svetambar, Shvetambara or Swetambar) is one of the two main branches of Jainism, the other being the Digambara. Śvētāmbara means "white-clad", and refers to its ascetics' practice of wearing white clothes, which sets it apart from the Digambara "sky-clad" Jains, whose ascetic practitioners go nude. Śvētāmbaras do not believe that ascetics must practice nudity.

The Svetambara and Digambara traditions have had historical differences ranging from their dress code, their temples and iconography, attitude towards Jain nuns, their legends and the texts they consider as important. Svetambara Jain communities are currently found mainly in Gujarat, Rajasthan and coastal regions of Maharashtra. According to Jeffery D. Long, a scholar of Hindu and Jain studies, about four-fifths of all Jains in India are Svetambaras.

History
The Śvētāmbaras texts were codified at the Great Council of Vallabhi, which was held at Vallabhi in 454 CE.

Majority of the Svetambaras are murtipujakas, that is they actively offer devotional puja in temples, worship before the images or idols of Tirthankaras and important Jain goddesses. Others are split into various subtraditions where either Jain temples and halls are built but puja is minor, or where all construction and use of temples, images and idols is actively discouraged and avoided. These subtraditions began around 14th-century through 18th-century. One of the key Jain scholars who opposed devotional temples, images and idols was Lonka Shah (c. 1476 CE). These later subtraditions are primarily Sthānakavāsī and Terapanth orders. Early colonial era observers and some early 20th-century Jain writers such as Malvaniya hypothesized that this movement against idol worship may be the impact of Islam on Jainism, but later scholarship states that the subtraditions arose from an internal dispute and debate on the principle Ahimsa (non-violence). The new movements argued that the construction of temples or buildings of any kind, idols and images, as well as the puja rituals hurt and kill small creatures and microscopic life forms in soil, wood and other materials involved, and is thus against their core principle of non-violence.

The newer Śvētāmbara subtraditions cover their mouth with a white cloth or muhapatti to practise ahimsa even when they talk. By doing so they minimize the possibility of inhaling small organisms. The terapanthi order is strongly aniconic and has lakhs of followers in many parts of the world.

Early Jain images from Mathura depict Digambara iconography until late fifth century CE where Svetambara iconography starts appearing.

Differences with Digambara
Other than rejecting or accepting different ancient Jain texts, Digambaras and Śvētāmbara differ in other significant ways such as:
 Śvētāmbaras trace their practices and dress code to the teachings of Parshvanatha, the 23rd tirthankara, which they believe taught only Four restraints (a claim, scholars say is confirmed by the ancient Buddhist texts that discuss Jain monastic life.). Mahāvīra taught Five vows, which Digambara follow. The Digambara sect disagrees with the Śvētāmbara interpretations, and reject the theory of difference in Parshvanatha and Mahāvīra's teachings.
 Digambaras believe that both Parshvanāth and Mahāvīra remained unmarried, whereas Śvētāmbara believe the 23rd and 24th tirthankar did indeed marry. According to the Śvētāmbara version, Parshvanāth married Prabhavati, and Mahāvīraswāmi married Yashoda who bore him a daughter named Priyadarshana. The two sects also differ on the origin of Trishala, Mahāvīra's mother, as well as the details of Tirthankara's biographies such as how many auspicious dreams their mothers had when they were in the wombs.
 Digambara believe Rishabha, Vasupujya and Neminatha were the three tirthankaras who reached omniscience while in sitting posture and other tirthankaras were in standing ascetic posture. In contrast, Śvētāmbaras believe it was Rishabha, Nemi and Mahāvīra who were the three in sitting posture.
 Digambara monasticism rules are more rigid.
 Digambara iconography are plain, Śvētāmbara icons are decorated and colored to be more lifelike.
 According to Śvētāmbara Jain texts, from Kalpasūtras onwards, its monastic community has had more sadhvis than sadhus (female than male mendicants). In Tapa Gacch of the modern era, the ratio of sadhvis to sadhus (nuns to monks) is about 3.5 to 1. In contrast to Śvētāmbara, the Digambara sect monastic community has been predominantly male.
 In the Digambara tradition, a male human being is considered closest to the apex with the potential to achieve his soul's liberation from rebirths through asceticism. Women must gain karmic merit, to be reborn as man, and only then can they achieve spiritual liberation in the Digambara sect of Jainism. The Śvētāmbaras disagree with the Digambaras, believing that women can also achieve liberation from Saṃsāra through ascetic practices.
 The Śvētāmbaras state the 19th Tirthankara Māllīnātha was female.  However, Digambara reject this, and worship Mallinatha as a male.

See also
 Tirth Pat
 Śvētāmbara literature

References

Citations

Sources

External links

 
Schools of Jainism